Michael Harrington (1928–1989) was an American writer and broadcaster as well as a political activist and theorist.

Mike or Michael Harrington may also refer to:

Politicians
Michael J. Harrington (born 1936), American legislator from Massachusetts
Michael Harrington, American Democratic politician (2008 California State Assembly election#District 3)
Michael Harrington (New Hampshire politician), American legislator from New Hampshire (New Hampshire House of Representatives#Strafford)
Mike Harrington, American politician from Delaware (List of state parties of the Republican Party (United States))

Sports personalities
Michael C. Harrington, American horse racing trainer (2012 Preakness Stakes#The full chart)
Michael Harrington, American ice hockey linesman (2019 World Junior Ice Hockey Championships#Officials)
Michael Harrington (soccer) (born 1986), American soccer player
Mike Harrington (tennis), American tennis player

Others
Michael Harrington, Canadian bishop; officiated at 1953 consecration of Holy Rosary Cathedral in Vancouver
Michael Harrington (Canadian writer) (1916–1999), Newfoundland writer and editor
Mike Harrington, American computer game developer since 1985
Michael Alphonsus Harrington (1900–1973), Canadian clergyman and bishop

See also
Harrington (surname)